Paulo Miguel Campos de Sousa (born 17 September 1980) is a Portuguese former professional footballer who played as a defensive midfielder.

Club career
A product of local Boavista FC's youth system, Sousa was born in Vila Nova de Gaia, Porto District, and played for its first team from January 2006 to June 2007, totalling 24 Primeira Liga appearances during his spell. He also represented C.D. Aves, G.D. Estoril Praia and C.D. Trofense (2007–08, featuring in no league games as the latter side achieved a first-ever promotion to the top flight and being released at the season's closure).

After two years without being able to find a club, Sousa retired from the game in the summer of 2010, aged only 29. His first match in the top division occurred on 4 February 2001, playing 85 minutes for Aves in a 0–0 away draw against S.C. Campomaiorense.

References

External links

1980 births
Living people
Sportspeople from Vila Nova de Gaia
Portuguese footballers
Association football midfielders
Primeira Liga players
Liga Portugal 2 players
Segunda Divisão players
Boavista F.C. players
C.D. Aves players
G.D. Estoril Praia players
C.D. Trofense players
Portugal youth international footballers